I Can See Your House from Here is a 1994 jazz album by guitarists John Scofield and Pat Metheny. Scofield is heard on the left channel and Metheny on the right in this stereo recording. The band is rounded out by bass guitarist Steve Swallow and drummer Bill Stewart.

Track listing

Personnel
 John Scofield – electric and acoustic guitar (left channel)
 Pat Metheny – electric guitar, nylon-string acoustic guitar, guitar synthesizer (right channel)
 Steve Swallow – bass guitar
 Bill Stewart – drums

References

1994 albums
Instrumental albums
John Scofield albums
Pat Metheny albums
Blue Note Records albums